The Wyre Light was a  tall iron screw-pile lighthouse marking the navigation channel to the town of Fleetwood, Lancashire, England.

History 
The lighthouse was designed by Alexander Mitchell, an Irish engineer who developed the screwpile concept. It was the first screwpile lighthouse ever to be lit. Although construction of the Maplin Sands Light on the northern bank of the Thames estuary had started before Wyre Light, the latter was completed in a much shorter period of time. These lights inspired other similar constructions such as the Thomas Point Shoal Light in the United States.

The Wyre Light along with a pair of on shore lighthouses, the Beach Lighthouse and the Pharos provided a navigational guide to shipping entering the Wyre estuary.

The Light's base consisted of seven wrought iron piles embedded in the sands. The six corner piles formed a hexagonal platform of  diameter. (The seventh pile served as a centre pillar.) The platform supported the lantern and a two-storey building to house the keeper. Construction began in 1839 and the lantern was lit on 6 June 1840. The building was destroyed by fire in 1948 and not replaced. After the fire, the beacon was made automatic and eventually replaced by a lighted buoy in 1979, leaving behind a derelict structure.

On 25 July 2017, the lighthouse partially collapsed into the sea.

See also 

 Maplin Sands
 Screw-pile lighthouse
 List of lighthouses in England

References

Sources 
 H N Denham, Sailing directions from Port Lynas to Liverpool...  Mawdsley, Liverpool, 1840

External links 
 
 History of the type

Lighthouses completed in 1840
Buildings and structures in Fleetwood
Lighthouses in England